Midamiella is a genus of longhorn beetles of the subfamily Lamiinae, containing the following species:

 Midamiella hecabe (Dillon & Dillon, 1945)
 Midamiella santaremensis (Dillon & Dillon, 1945)

References

Onciderini